Labunino is a rural locality (a village) in Rybinsky District of Yaroslavl Oblast, Russia.  Population: 3 (2007 est.).

References

Rural localities in Yaroslavl Oblast